Jiaomen Station is an elevated station of Line 4 of the Guangzhou Metro. It started operations on 28 June 2007. It is located at the junction of Nansha Avenue and Fenghuang Avenue in the town of Huangge, Nansha District.

Station layout

Exits

References

Railway stations in China opened in 2007
Guangzhou Metro stations in Nansha District